Dholki is an Indian Marathi language film directed by Raju Desai and Vishal Desai. The film stars Siddhartha Jadhav, Manasi Naik, Kashmira Kulkarni and Sayaji Shinde. Music by Tubby Parikh. The film was released on 28 August 2015.

Synopsis 
Lala, who happens to find his late father's 'dholki', realises that he has a talent for playing it. However, his mother is worried that his passion would lead him to trouble with the village head.

Cast 
 Siddhartha Jadhav as Lala
 Manasi Naik
 Kashmira Kulkarni
 Sayaji Shinde as Patil 
 Jyoti Chandekar as Lala's Mother 
 Sanjay Kulkarni
 Dr Vilas Ujawane
 Vijay Nikam

Soundtrack

Critical response 
Dholki film received mixed reviews from critics. Mihir Bhanage of The Times of India gave the film a rating of 2.5/5 and wrote "Dholki subsequently slips into nothing more than a formulaic film that will enthrall the front-row audience at single screens". Soumitra Pote of Maharashtra Times gave the film a rating of 2.5/5 and wrote "Overall,This is a movie for a small audience. If you want to watch a movie as a time pass without getting kick in the head, there is no problem in taking a chance". A reviewer from Zee News gave the film a rating of 2.5/5 and wrote "The second half of the movie is more interesting.. Dholki has comedy, dance, suspense, drama in this movie".

References

External links
 
 

2015 films
2010s Marathi-language films
Indian drama films